Larraya is a locality and council located in the municipality of Cizur, in Navarre province, Spain, Spain. As of 2020, it has a population of 55.

Geography 
Larraya is located 11km west-southwest of Pamplona.

References

Populated places in Navarre